The 380 kV Ems Overhead Powerline Crossing is a power line crossing for two circuits on the Ems River South of Weener, Germany. It is mounted on two 110 m tall pylons with two crossbars. The length of the span is 405 m.

The crossing was an obstacle for ships built by Meyer Werft in Papenburg.  Although the ships could pass beneath the line, the clearance was often so close that the line had to be switched off.  When this procedure was followed on November 4, 2006, in order to let the vessel Norwegian Pearl pass, a large blackout occurred in many parts of Europe.  According to official reports, this was caused because of the switching off of this line.

In summer 2007, the towers were rebuilt to be 26 metres (85 feet) higher.

References

Powerline river crossings
Electric power transmission systems in Germany